This list of botanical gardens and arboretums in North Dakota is intended to include all significant botanical gardens and arboretums in the U.S. state of North Dakota

See also
List of botanical gardens and arboretums in the United States

References 

 
Arboreta in North Dakota
botanical gardens and arboretums in North Dakota